Dushku is an Albanian surname. Notable people with the surname include:

 Eliza Dushku (born 1980), American actress and producer
 Erjon Dushku (born 1985), Albanian footballer
 Nate Dushku (born 1977), American director, producer, and actor

Albanian-language surnames